Wierzchowiska Drugie may refer to the following places:
Wierzchowiska Drugie, Janów Lubelski County in Lublin Voivodeship (east Poland)
Wierzchowiska Drugie, Świdnik County in Lublin Voivodeship (east Poland)
Wierzchowiska Drugie, Masovian Voivodeship (east-central Poland)